Mark Gresham (born 6 March 1956, Atlanta, Georgia, United States) is an American composer and music journalist.

In 2003 he was recipient of ASCAP's Deems Taylor Award for Sounds Like Home, an article about American composer Jennifer Higdon, published in Creative Loafing (Atlanta) (13 November 2002).  In addition to being a contributing writer for Creative Loafing (Atlanta) from 2002 to 1012, Gresham has also written for NewMusicBox  (the online journal of the American Music Center) and other publications. He was a music journalist/critic for ArtsATL, Gresham initially writing articles for the online-only publication starting in mid-2011 (at the time known as ArtsCriticATL), then more extensively as of November 2011 upon the departure of Pierre Ruhe, its principal music critic, executive director and co-founder. Gresham quit writing for ArtsATL in February 2019 over editorial issues that had begun to emerged near the end of 2018. At that point, what had been a very occasional personal music blog, EarRelevant, became for Gresham a full-time music journal, for which he is both publisher and principal writer.

References

External links
Mark Gresham's website
EarRelevant (music journal)
Lux Nova Press (music publisher)

1956 births
Living people
American male composers
21st-century American composers
American music critics
American music journalists
Classical music critics
21st-century American male musicians